Norwich Public Schools (NPS, Norwich School District) is the public school system for the town of Norwich, Connecticut. NPS serves approximately 3,600 students every year through 10 school locations within the City of Norwich. running a 9–12 transition academy, a regional adult education program, a child care center, seven elementary schools, two magnet middle schools, and a child care center. 8th-grade graduates are able to various local high school programs, such as Norwich Free Academy, Norwich Technical High School, Ledyard Agri-Science Program, LEARN Regional Magnet Schools, Bacon Academy, Ella T. Grasso Southeastern Technical High School, and other local programs. Norwich Public Schools employs more than 1,000 staff, including teachers and administrators. Norwich Public Schools has been serving the City of Norwich for nearly 150 years, with the opening of its first school in 1875. The John Mason School building, built in 1895, is currently in use as the school system's district office.

Vision and mission 

Vision

To enable each child to reach their full potential.

Mission

The Norwich Public Schools will provide each student a rigorous, effective teaching and learning environment where equity is the norm, excellence is the goal, student health and safety is assured.

List of Schools

Early Learning Centers
As of the 2021-2022 school year
 Bishop Early Learning Center (Built 1925, Renovated 1999)

Elementary schools
As of the 2021-2022 school year
 Samuel Huntington Elementary School (Built 1928, Renovated 1999)
 Thomas W. Mahan Elementary School (Built 1968, Renovated 1995)
 Veterans Memorial Elementary School (Built 1968, Renovated 1995)
 John B. Stanton Elementary School (Built 1956, Renovated 1995)
 Uncas Elementary School (Built 1975)
 John M. Moriarty Environmental Science Magnet Elementary School (Built 1975)
 Wequonnoc Arts & Technology Magnet Elementary School (Built 1962, Renovated 2005)

Middle schools
As of the 2021–2022 school year
 
 Teachers' Memorial Global Studies Magnet Middle School (Built 1975)
 Kelly STEAM Magnet Middle School (Built 1962, Renovated 2010)

High schools
As of the 2021-2022 school year, Norwich Public Schools does not operate any high schools. Students within the NPS system are allowed to select from a number of local high school options, and by default will move on to Norwich Free Academy. Other options include Norwich Technical High School, Ella T. Grasso Southeastern Technical High School, and Bacon Academy.

Transition & Adult Education Programs

 Norwich Transition Academy
 Norwich Regional Adult Education

Former Schools 
 Norwich High School (Converted into Norwich Regional Adult Education Facility, 2007)
 Greeneville Elementary School (Closed, Fall 2010)
 Bishop Elementary School (Converted into Early Learning Center, 2010)
 William A. Buckingham School (Closed, 2011)
 Deborah Tenant-Zinewicz School (Converted into Norwich Transition Academy, 2020)

Population

2019–2021 school year 

District data from 2019–2020 school year

Demographics

 1,238 or 34.5% Hispanic
 1,063 or 29.6% White
 663 or 18.5% Black
 363 or 10.1% Multi-racial
 230 or 6.4% Asian
 18 or 0.5% Native American

Free and reduced lunches 
 67% free or reduced, 33% paid

Special populations
Special Education

As of the 2019-2020 school year, 695 students in the district were identified as having disabilities.

References

External links
Norwich Public Schools district website
NECS - Norwich Public Schools
- CT DOE School Facilities Survey, 2013 - NPS Website

See also 

 Connecticut v. Amero

School districts in Connecticut
Norwich, Connecticut
Education in New London County, Connecticut
School districts established in 1875